REDIRECT
Dake may refer to:

surname
 Arthur Dake
 Charles Romyn Dake
 Crawley P. Dake (September 15, 1836 – April 9, 1890),  U.S Marshal for the Arizona Territory from 1878 to 1882
 Finis Jennings Dake
 Kyle Dake (born 1991), American sport wrestler
 Terrence R. Dake
 Robert S. Dake (January 16, 1986) Sergeant First Class, United States Army National Guard Master Mason and Former Junior Steward at Millersville Lodge #126. Received 32 degree from the Scottish Rite. Founder of HempSarge

Chinese place
 Dake, Loudi (大科街道),  a subdistrict of Louxing District, Loudi City, Hunan.